A Girl Goes Ashore is a 1938 German drama film directed by Werner Hochbaum and starring Elisabeth Flickenschildt, Günther Lüders and Heidi Kabel. It is set in the port city of Hamburg and was partly shot on location there.

It was made at the Babelsberg Studios in Berlin as well as in Hamburg. The film's sets were designed by the art directors Karl Haacker and Willy Schiller.

Cast
In alphabetical order:
 Franz Arzdorf as Dr. Ried
 Herbert A.E. Böhme as Friedrich Semmler
 Erich Feldt as Heinrich Semmler
 Elisabeth Flickenschildt as Erna Quandt
 Berta Gast as Amalie Stürmer
 Erika Glässner as Frau Juhl, Widow
 Karl Günther as Walter Stürmer
 Heidi Kabel as Inge
 Carl Kuhlmann as Jonny Hasenbein
 Lotte Lang as Maid
 Günther Lüders as Krischan
 Alfred Maack as Quandt
 Hans Mahler as Hein Groterjahn
 Edith Meinhard
 Claus Michahelles as Rolfi Semmler
 Luise Morland as Grete Schilling
 Maria Paudler as Lisa Stürmer
 Walter Petersen as Otto
 Claire Reigbert as Aunt Mariechen
 Friedrich Schmidt as Captain Lüders
 Gisela Scholz as Emma Semmler
 Bruno Wolfgang as Alfred

References

Bibliography

External links 
 

1938 films
Films of Nazi Germany
German drama films
1938 drama films
1930s German-language films
Films directed by Werner Hochbaum
UFA GmbH films
Films set in Hamburg
Films shot in Hamburg
German black-and-white films
Films shot at Babelsberg Studios
1930s German films